Radeh-ye Sadat (also Romanized as Radeh-ye Sādāt; also known as Sādāt) is a village in Bahmanshir-e Jonubi Rural District, in the Central District of Abadan County, Khuzestan Province, Iran. At the 2006 census, its population was 1,633, in 322 families.

References 

Populated places in Abadan County